Notuner Gaan (The Song of Youth), more popularly known (after its first line) as Chol Chol Chol, is the national march of Bangladesh, whose lyrics and tune were written by national poet Kazi Nazrul Islam in 1928. It was first published in the newspaper Shikha ( Flame) with the title Notuner Gaan ( The Song of Youth) and was later included in Nazrul's book Shondha ( The Evening). The Bangladeshi government adopted this song as the national marching song of Bangladesh on 13 January 1972 in its first meeting after the country's independence. The first lines of the song are played at most military ceremonies or functions. The Daily Star has referred to it as the national military song.

Lyrics 

Here are the rest of the original lyrics from which the National march of Bangladesh came (continuing from the last section):

See also 
 Amar Shonar Bangla (The national anthem of Bangladesh)
 O Mon Romzaner Oi Rozar Sheshe (Most famous Bengali song of Eid ul Fitr)

References

External links 
Prime Minister's Office, Government of the People's Republic of Bangladesh

Bangladeshi music
1972 in Bangladesh
Songs written by Kazi Nazrul Islam
Asian anthems
Bengali-language songs
Bengali-language poems
Kazi Nazrul Islam
Bangladeshi patriotic songs
Bangladeshi songs
Military marches
1928 in British India